Kaustuv Sanyal (born 1969) is an Indian molecular biologist, mycologist and a professor at the Molecular Biology and Genetics Unit of the Jawaharlal Nehru Centre for Advanced Scientific Research (JNCASR). He is known for his molecular and genetic studies of pathogenic yeasts such as Candida and Cryptococcus). An alumnus of Bidhan Chandra Krishi Viswavidyalaya and Madurai Kamaraj University from where he earned a BSc in agriculture and MSc in biotechnology respectively, Sanyal did his doctoral studies at Bose Institute to secure a PhD in Yeast genetics. He moved to the University of California, Santa Barbara, USA to work in the laboratory of John Carbon on the discovery of centromeres in Candida albicans. He joined JNCASR in 2005.  He is a member of the Faculty of 1000 in the disciplines of Microbial Evolution and Genomics and has delivered invited speeches which include the Gordon Research Conference, EMBO conferences on comparative genomics and kinetochores. The Department of Biotechnology of the Government of India awarded him the National Bioscience Award for Career Development, one of the highest Indian science awards, for his contributions to biosciences, in 2012.  He has also been awarded with the prestigious Tata Innovation Fellowship in 2017. The National Academy of Sciences, India elected him as a fellow in 2014. He is also an elected fellow of Indian Academy of Sciences (2017), and the Indian National Science Academy (2018). In 2019, he has been elected to Fellowship in the American Academy of Microbiology (AAM), the honorific leadership group within the American Society for Microbiology.

. He was awarded the J.C. Bose National Fellowship in 2020.

Selected bibliography

See also 

 Chromosome segregation
 Candida albicans

References 

N-BIOS Prize recipients
Indian scientific authors
Living people
Indian medical academics
Indian medical researchers
Scientists from Karnataka
1969 births
Madurai Kamaraj University alumni
Fellows of The National Academy of Sciences, India
Bidhan Chandra Krishi Viswavidyalaya alumni
Scientists from West Bengal